Tigra was a Swiss professional cycling team that existed from 1950 to 1969. Its main sponsor was Swiss bicycle manufacturer Tigra.

References

Cycling teams based in Switzerland
Cycling teams based in France
Defunct cycling teams based in Switzerland
Defunct cycling teams based in France
1950 establishments in Switzerland
1969 disestablishments in Switzerland
Cycling teams established in 1950
Cycling teams disestablished in 1969